Kotnik is a Slovenian surname. Notable people with the surname include:

Andrej Kotnik (born 1995), Slovenian footballer
Ciril Kotnik (1895–1948), Yugoslav diplomat
Gloria Kotnik (born 1989), Slovenian snowboarder
Matic Kotnik (born 1990), Slovenian footballer
Renato Kotnik (born 1970), Slovenian footballer
Slavko Kotnik (born 1962), Yugoslav-Slovenian basketball player
Stanko Kotnik (1928–2004), Slovenian academic and editor

See also
 

Slovene-language surnames